Gotham Gazette can refer to either

Gotham Gazette - an online newsletter published about New York
Gotham Gazette - appearing in various incarnations of the Batman franchise